Ilaaka is a 1989 Indian Hindi-language action drama film directed by Aziz Sejawal. It features an ensemble cast of Mithun Chakraborty, Sanjay Dutt, Amrita Singh, Madhuri Dixit, Raakhee Gulzar, Om Puri, Amrish Puri along with Dharmendra making a special appearance.
Ilaaka released worldwide on 12th May 1989, and received mixed reviews from critics. Nonthenless, it was a commercial success at the box office.

Plot
Ilaaka is the story of Raja who always stands against injustice and corruption. Raja is in love with Vidya, the school master's daughter. He is supported by Inspector Suraj Verma. Their fight is against the 'Father of Evil', Naagar, as he controls the entire Ilaaka (area). Sub-Inspector Neha is the love of Suraj. Inspector Dharam Verma has a score to settle with Naagar. Naagar unleashes his reign of terror.

Cast
 Mithun Chakraborty as Raja
 Sanjay Dutt as Inspector Suraj Verma
 Madhuri Dixit as Vidya
 Amrita Singh as Sub-Inspector Neha Singh
 Dharmendra as Inspector Dharam Verma (Special Appearance)
 Raakhee as Mrs. Dharam Verma
 Om Puri as Bheema 
 Dalip Tahil as Niranjan 
 Amrish Puri as Naagar
 Goga Kapoor as Swami
 Mahesh Anand as Swami's Son
 Arun Bakshi as Babban
 Avtar Gill as MLA Becharam 
 Praveen Kumar as Naagar's Henchman
 Johnny Lever as Chhote Swami
 Mac Mohan as Mohan
 Yunus Parvez as Member of Parliament
 Bharat Bhushan as Man With Suitcase
 Asha Sharma as Mrs. Singh 
 Jagdeep as Constable Thanedar Tehsildar Singh
 A. K. Hangal as School Master 
 Bharat Kapoor as Birju 
 Manik Irani as Ustad
 Gurbachan Singh as Smuggler who kidnapped children
 Gavin Packard as Smuggler who kidnapped children
 Huma Khan as Dancer

Soundtrack
Music by Nadeem-Shravan.

References

External links
 

1989 films
1980s Hindi-language films
Films scored by Nadeem–Shravan
Fictional portrayals of the Maharashtra Police
Films directed by Aziz Sejawal